Užusaliai is a village in Jonava district municipality, in Kaunas County, in central Lithuania. According to the 2011 census, the village has a population of 584 people. Administrative centre of Užusaliai Eldership.

Užusaliai has a primary school, a library (works since 1940), a post office (ZIP code: 55044), a cultural centre and a cemetery.

Education 
Užusaliai primary school

Gallery

References 

Villages in Jonava District Municipality
Kovensky Uyezd